Adelaide United Football Club, an association football club based in Adelaide, South Australia, was founded in 2003. They became the first southern member admitted into the A-League in 2005, having spent their first and last season participating in the National Soccer League. The club's first team have competed in numerous nationally and internationally organised competitions, and all players who have played between 25 and 99 such matches, either as a member of the starting eleven or as a substitute, are listed below.

Each player's details include the duration of his Adelaide United career, his typical playing position while with the club, and the number of games played and goals scored in all senior competitive matches. Two of these players, Carl Veart and Aurelio Vidmar, went on to manage Adelaide United. Paul Izzo fell one short of 100 appearances for Adelaide United. The list includes eight players who are still contracted to the club, and so can add to their totals.

Key
 The list is ordered first by date of debut, and then if necessary in alphabetical order.
 Appearances as a substitute are included.
 Statistics are correct up to and including the match played on 11 March 2023. Where a player left the club permanently after this date, his statistics are updated to his date of leaving.

Players

Players highlighted in bold are still actively playing for Adelaide United.

References
General
 
 
 

Specific

Adelaide United FC players
Adelaide United
Players
Association football player non-biographical articles